Joseph Frimpong is a Ghanaian politician and member of the Eighth Parliament of the Fourth Republic of Ghana representing the Nkawkaw Constituency in the Eastern Region on the ticket of the New Patriotic Party.

Early life and education 
Frempong was born on 16 July 1969 and hails from Obo Kwahu in the Eastern Region. He completed his GCE O level in 1990 and his GCE A level in 1992. He later obtained his Bachelors degree in Social Studies in 2004. He further had his master's degree in Public Affairs in 2011.

Career 
Frempong was a teacher in Adosu Islamic School. He was also the Geography teacher at the Sendema Senior High Technical School. He was also the Geography teacher in Nkawkaw Senior High School. He was also the Assistant Lecturer at the University of Education, Winneba.

Political career 
Frempong is a member of NPP and currently the MP for the Nkawkaw Constituency in the Eastern region. In the 2020 Ghana general elections, he won the parliamentary seat with 44,067 votes whilst the NDC parliamentary aspirant Oppong Francis had 14,272 votes.

Committees 
Frempong is a member of the Gender and Children committee and also a member of Communications Committee.

Personal life 
Frempong is a Christian.

Philanthropy 
In August 2021, Frempong helped over 15,000 people in his constituency to either renew or register for the National Health Insurance Scheme. He also presented electric beds to the Nkawkaw Municipality health directorate.

References 

Living people
Ghanaian MPs 2021–2025
New Patriotic Party politicians
1969 births
People from Eastern Region (Ghana)